Zhmakin is a surname. Notable people with the surname include:

 Stanislav Zhmakin (born 1982), Russian ice hockey player

Russian-language surnames